Hinks is an English surname.

Notable people called Hinks include:
 James Hinks (manufacturer) (c.1816–1905), oil lamp manufacturer in Birmingham, England
 James Hinks (1829–1878), Irish–British dog breeder
 Joseph Hinks (1840–1931), British manufacturer and inventor, son of James Hinks (c.1816–1905) 
 Arthur Robert Hinks (1873–1945), British astronomer and geographer
 Timothy Hinks (professor) (1977-present), professor in respiratory science

See also
 Hanks (disambiguation)
 Hinkly
 Hincks